The GE Universal Series is a series of diesel locomotives intended for the export market introduced by General Electric in early 1956. General Electric had previously partnered with Alco, producing locomotives for export using Alco’s 244 engine, and provided electrical parts for Alco’s domestic production. However, with the advent of the Universal Series, GE ended its partnership with Alco and entered the export locomotive market on its own.

The export-oriented Universal Series should not be confused with the “U-Boats” for the North American market, which began with the U25B. The Universal Series are built to a much smaller loading gauge (Bern loading gauge) and are significantly lower in weight when compared to US locomotives sharing the same engine and horsepower rating. Universal Series locomotives can also be identified by the lack of battery boxes usually found under North American locomotives' cabins

Naming convention 
The designations of the Universal series describe the locomotive model in compact form: U for Universal, followed by the engine's nominal horsepower rating in hundreds, and finally the number of axles; B = B-B (4 axles); C = C-C (6 axles). An 'M' indicated a modified version of the base model. Along with their development, the same numbers were often reused by different locomotive models. Even the same designation could be shared with domestic locomotives. For example, both the U18C and U20C model numbers refer to different locomotives offered at different dates with different engines (8- and 12-cylinder); and the export U30C model shared the same model number with the US U30C, but had a 12-cylinder, rather than a 16-cylinder engine.

Engines 
The initial models of the Universal Series used Caterpillar 375 (8-cylinder), Caterpillar 397 (12-cylinder), Cooper-Bessemer FWB-6L (6-cylinder), Cooper-Bessemer FVBL-8 and FVBL-12 (8- and 12-cylinder, respectively). Later models substituted higher-power Caterpillar engines for the smaller locomotives or GE’s own 7FDL8 and 7FDL12 engines for the larger ones. Unlike EMD, GE never had a 16-cylinder engined export locomotive model in the Universal series.

Specifications 
Based on the March 1989 GE Locomotives catalog, the following models were offered at the following specifications.

Models 
Upon introduction in 1956, nine locomotive models were offered, as follows:

The evolution of Universal Series locomotives is complex due to the frequent model name changes and the reusing of the same model names for different locomotives. One method to understand the growth and development of the Universal Series is to divide the nine original models into three groups: 1) small locomotives, 2) intermediate powered locomotives, and 3) high powered locomotives.

Small Locomotives 

In this table, and the following two tables, asterisks indicate repeated model numbers

Between the initial models and the first update, the Caterpillar 375 and 397 engines were replaced with 379 and 398, respectively.

The UM6B was a narrow-gauge variant of the U6B, built for South African Railways.

Intermediate Powered Locomotives (8-cylinder) 

Between the first and second updates, the Cooper-Bessemer engine was replaced with 7FDL8 engine. The body style was also changed with a low short hood and Hi-Ad trucks replacing the high short hood and outside-equalized trucks.

A variation of the U18C was the U18A1A, built for the Indonesian railway. These locomotives had the same C-C trucks but one fewer traction motor in each truck, and downrated to 1650 horsepower. Most of these locomotives have been rebuilt to U18C standards.

The 6-cylinder U9B and U9C models were an evolutionary dead end, and no uprated versions were produced.

High Powered Locomotives (12-cylinder) 

As with the intermediate powered locomotives, the Cooper-Bessemer engine was also replaced with 7FDL12 engine. 

The differently-rated U22C, U26C and U30C models were offered at the same time.

The U18C and the earlier U20C model had a variant with an additional non-powered leading axle in each truck, resulting in a lower axle loading and a 1C-C1 wheel arrangement. These locomotives were only purchased by the South African Railways.

No U18B was produced, and the few UD18 locomotives built were exported to Mexico.

Universal Series Locomotives in Numbers 
Between 1956 and 2001, 4091 Universal Series locomotives were built, consisting of the following models:

South Africa has the largest number of Universal Series locomotives, with 1040 locomotives (including SG10 and SG15 models), followed by Brazil with 864 locomotives. Other countries owning more than 100 locomotives are Argentina (182), Colombia (167), Indonesia (178), Mozambique (120) and The Philippines (126).

The majority of the locomotives were built in the General Electric plant in Erie, Pennsylvania, however, licensees such as Dorbyl (South Africa), GE do Brasil (Brazil) and Babcock y Wilcox (Spain) constructed significant numbers of locomotives. Other licensees building smaller numbers of locomotives included Krupp (49), GE Lokindo (16), GE Montreal (16), Goninan (13) and Nippon Sharyo (1).

Production of Universal Series locomotives peaked in the 1970s, with almost 2000 locomotives built during this period.

The majority of Universal Series locomotives operated on meter gauge and 3 ft 6 in gauge railway lines.

Gallery

Further developments 
Parallel to the developments of domestic US locomotives, ‘Dash-7’ versions of Universal Series locomotives were produced, among others, C18-7i (Egypt), C20-7i and C24-7i (Pakistan), C22-7i (Argentina), and C30-7i (Iran and Mongolia). The ADTranz ‘Blue Tiger’ (DE-AC33C) was a high-powered locomotive designed for the export market. During its short production run, three variations were produced: Germany (1435 mm gauge, 7FDL12 engine, 21 t axle load), Malaysia (1000 mm gauge, 7FDL12 engine, 20 t axle load), and Pakistan (1676 mm gauge, 7FDL16 engine).

As of 2022, no Universal Series locomotive remained in the Wabtec (successor to GE Transportation) catalog. However, the C30ACi and C21EMP-C25EMP series are the direct descendants of the U18C lineage; while the C20ACi is the descendant of the U12C series. Examples of the modern-day versions of Universal Series locomotives are Chilean C23EM, Indonesian C20EMP and CM20EMP, and Pakistani C20EMP locomotives.

See also 
 List of GE locomotives

References

Notes

Bibliography 

 
 
 
 
 
 
 
 

Universal Series
Diesel locomotives of the United States
Standard gauge locomotives of the United States